Caerleon is a historic house in the Sydney suburb of Bellevue Hill. It is listed on the Register of the National Estate as well as having a New South Wales heritage listing. It was named after Caerleon, a small town in Wales.

History and description
Caerleon is a two-storey Queen Anne home built in 1885. Original plans for the house were drawn up by Sydney architect Harry Kent, but they were reworked extensively by Maurice Adams in London, England. Controversy followed when Kent found that his name was left out altogether when the plans were exhibited in London. Kent nevertheless supervised the construction of the house, which was designed for another member of the Fairfax family, Charles B. Fairfax.

The house represents a rich example of Queen Anne elements: red brick walls with stone dressing, terracota shingles, balconies, bay windows, verandas, leadlight windows and elaborate chimneys. It is said to have been the first Queen Anne home in Australia and set the tone for the Federation Queen Anne homes that were to become so popular. It was sold for $22 million in January 2008.

Gallery

See also
 Architecture of Australia
 Architecture of Sydney
 Federation architecture

References

New South Wales Heritage Database
Houses in Bellevue Hill, New South Wales
Houses completed in 1885
1885 establishments in Australia
New South Wales places listed on the defunct Register of the National Estate
Queen Anne architecture in Australia